The Union Fair is an annual agricultural fair in Union, Maine. It began in 1869 and, since 1886, all fairs in Knox County have taken place in Union.

No fair was held in 1917–18, 1942–45 nor 2020.

References

Further reading
 The First Century — Union Fair 1869–1969 by Donald and Marion Mattoon

External links
 Union Fair - Official site

Fairs in the United States
Recurring events established in 1869
Tourist attractions in Knox County, Maine
1869 establishments in Maine
Union, Maine